Caraway Hall is a historic dormitory building on the campus of Arkansas Tech University in Russellville, Arkansas, U.S. It is a brick building with Colonial Revival styling, built in 1934 with funding from the Federal Emergency Administration of Public Works, later known as the Public Works Administration. It is roughly H-shaped, with a central three-story section with a gabled roof and end chimneys, which is flanked by two-story flat-roofed wings, one longer than the other.

The building was listed on the National Register of Historic Places in 1992.

See also
National Register of Historic Places listings in Pope County, Arkansas

References

University and college buildings on the National Register of Historic Places in Arkansas
Colonial Revival architecture in Arkansas
Government buildings completed in 1934
Buildings and structures in Russellville, Arkansas
Arkansas Tech University
1934 establishments in Arkansas
National Register of Historic Places in Pope County, Arkansas
Public Works Administration in Arkansas